Hans Jörg Stetter (born 8 April 1930, in Munich) is a German mathematician, specializing in numerical analysis.

Stetter studied at the University of Munich and then at the Technical University of Munich. For one academic year, he was an undergraduate exchange student in Fort Collins at the Colorado State College of Agriculture and Mechanic Arts, i.e. Colorado A&M (renamed, in 1957, Colorado State University), where he participated in the Putnam competition and was awarded an honorable mention. After receiving a master's degree as a qualification for teaching in secondary school, he studied the numerical analysis of partial differential equations (PDEs) with applications to fluid dynamics and received from the Technical University of Munich his promotion (Ph.D.) under Robert Max Friedrich Sauer with dissertation Beiträge zum Wechselwirkungsproblem in linearisierter Überschallströmung (Contributions to the interaction problem in linearized supersonic flow). Stetter became in 1965 a professor ordinarius at the Technical University of Vienna (Technische Hochschule Wien, which was renamed in 1975 the Technische Universität Wien).

Later he turned to the numerical analysis of ordinar differential equations (ODEs) and specialized in error analysis and asymptotic developments, among other ODE topics. Based upon ideas published by the physicist Lewis Fry Richardson and by the astronomer Pedro E. Zadunaisky, Stetter developed in the 1970s an iterative method, now called the defect correction method, for error estimation in ODEs. He also dealt with polynomial algebra at the interface between numerical analysis and computer algebra.

In 1974 Stetter was an Invited Speaker at the ICM in Vancouver. In 1984 he was elected a member of the Academy of Sciences Leopoldina.

Selected publications

Articles
with Friedrich L. Bauer: Zur numerischen Fourier-Transformation, Numerische Mathematik, vol. 1, 1959, 208–220 
Asymptotic expansions for the error in discretization algorithms for non-linear functional equations, Numerische Mathematik, vol. 7, 1965 
Stabilizing predictors for weakly unstable correctors, Mathematics of Computation, vol. 19, 1965, 84–89 
The defect correction principle and discretization methods, Numerische Mathematik, vol. 29, 1978, 425–433

Books
Analysis of Discretization Methods in Ordinary Differential Equations, Springer 1973; 
as editor with Klaus Böhmer: Defect correction methods, Springer 1984; 
Numerical Polynomial Algebra, SIAM 2004

References

External links
Oral History Interview with Philip J. Davis, SIAM 2005
"Hans Jörg Stetter" by Roland Burlisch, 2005 (salutation on the occasion of Stetter's 75 birthday) 

20th-century German mathematicians
Technical University of Munich alumni
Academic staff of TU Wien
Members of the German Academy of Sciences Leopoldina
1930 births
Living people